The 1924 Erskine Seceders football team represented Erskine College in the 1924 college football season.

Schedule

References

Erskine
Erskine Flying Fleet football seasons
College football winless seasons
Erskine Seceders football